Idi Muzhakkam is a 1980 Indian Malayalam film,  directed and produced by Sreekumaran Thampi. The film stars Jayan, Ratheesh, Shubha and Sukumaran in the lead roles. The film has musical score by Shyam. The film was a highly sensational film of the release .

Cast

Jayan as Bheeman
Ratheesh as Jose
Shubha as Chirutha
Sukumaran as Krishnan Thirumeni
Roja Ramani as  Panchali
Sukumari as Gouri 
Jagathy Sreekumar as Rajan Unnithan/Thyagacharya
Manavalan Joseph as Valiya Panikkar
Balan K. Nair as Govindan Unnithan
Janardanan
Kanakadurga as Gayathridevi/Marykutti
Lalu Alex as Moosa
N. Govindankutty as Varkey
Poojappura Ravi as Kochu Panikkar
 John Samual
 Kailas Nath
 Arur Sathyan
 Peyad Vijayan
 Haripad Soman
 N.S Vanjiyoor
 Unnikrishnan
 Paramu
 Krishnan Kutty
 Dhanya
 Sree Santhi
 Mrs. Shoba

Soundtrack
The music was composed by Shyam and the lyrics were written by Sreekumaran Thampi.

Box office
The film was commercial success.

References

External links
 

1980 films
1980s Malayalam-language films
Films directed by Sreekumaran Thampi